refers to the anime (produced in prospect of being) broadcast by independent stations generally located in the Kanto, Chukyo and Kansai regions of Japan, who are members of the Japanese Association of Independent Television Stations (JAITS). In contrast to the major network stations such as TV Tokyo who are the leading stakeholders in the production, the producers often pay the broadcasters as brokered programming.

See also 
 Independent UHF station
 Late night anime

References 

Anime television